Badkuhi is a census town in Chhindwara district  in the state of Madhya Pradesh, India.

Demographics
 India census, Badkuhi had a population of 10,764. Males constitute 52% of the population and females 48%. Badkuhi has an average literacy rate of 72%, higher than the national average of 59.5%; with 58% of the males and 42% of females literate. 11% of the population is under 6 years of age.

References

Cities and towns in Chhindwara district